Joseph Ventaja (4 February 1930 – 11 August 2003) was a French boxer who won the bronze medal in the featherweight division at the 1952 Summer Olympics in Helsinki. He was born in Casablanca, Morocco.

1952 Olympic results
Below are the results of Joseph Ventaja who competed for France as a featherweight at the 1952 Olympic boxing tournament in Helsinki:

 Round of 32: defeated Yuri Sokolov (Soviet Union) on points, 2-1
 Round of 16: defeated Sydney Greave (Pakistan) on points, 3-0
 Quarterfinal: defeated Edson Brown (United States) on points, 3-0
 Semifinal: lost to Sergio Caprari (Italy) on points, 1-2 (was awarded bronze medal)

Pro career
Ventaja began his career as a professional in 1956 and won his first 11 fights.  He retired in 1958 after a loss to Epiphane Akono.

External links
Joseph Ventaja's profile at databaseOlympics

Joseph Ventaja's profile at Sports Reference.com

1930 births
2003 deaths
Sportspeople from Casablanca
Featherweight boxers
Boxers at the 1952 Summer Olympics
Olympic boxers of France
Olympic bronze medalists for France
Olympic medalists in boxing
French male boxers
Medalists at the 1952 Summer Olympics